The Cochin Flower Show is a garden show held each year for five to six days in February - March days by the Ernakulam district Agri-Horticultural Society at the city of Kochi, Kerala, India. It used to be conducted at the Subhash Park, Park Avenue Road, Kochi until 2006. But, since 2007, the venue has been changed to Ernakulathappan Ground.

History

The Cochin Flower Show is in its 26th Edition now. It has been regularly attracting thousands of visitors and has become a major annual event in Kochi city.

The Cochin Flower Show 2008

The 2008 edition of the flower show is being held from 5 to 10 March, both days inclusive. It was inaugurated by V.J. Kurian, Chairman, Spices Board. Major highlights of the 2008 edition of the flower show include an exhibition of Italian flowers and Bonsai trees, and a display of the Kudumbashree bio-bin. Children may have found the Emu and the kennel stalls more interesting. Several awards were presented at the Show.

References

External links

 Article about the Cochin Flower Show 2008
 Article about the Cochin Flower Show 2007
 Article about the Cochin Flower Show 2006
 Article about the Cochin Flower Show 2005
 Article about the Cochin Flower Show 2004
 

Flower shows
Culture of Kochi